Two Lottery Tickets (Romanian: Două lozuri) is a 2016 Romanian comedy film directed by Paul Negoescu and loosely based on Waking Ned. It is a story of a working man losing his lottery ticket that was for a huge prize goes through bizarre events and takes another ticket and wins it. The name of the film is based on Ion Luca Caragiale's short story Două loturi.

Plot
Dinel is an auto-mechanic who is struggling and has marital problems. Sile is a carpenter and a gambler, habitually betting anything. Pompiliu is a government employee and a conspiracy theorist. The trio are friends and hearing Dinel's troubles they decide to try their luck at the lottery. They win the lottery, but Dinel, who kept the ticket, realizes he lost it when he was robbed by two thugs in front of his apartment. Pompiliu claims this is the Secret Service's doing, saying they give high price tickets to people as a retirement option that is without taxes. Sile doesn't believe it and urges Dinel to report the loss to the police. After having his palm read, Dinel comes to believe his wife is in a dire situation and requires his help—and for that he needs the money. Together, they start searching for the stolen golden ticket.

Cast
 Dragoș Bucur as Sile
 Dorian Boguță as Dinel 
 Alexandru Papadopol as Pompiliu

Reception
The Hollywood Reporter said of the film, "Though Two Lottery Tickets’ budget must have been modest, there is no sense that compromises had to be made to tell the story currently onscreen. The standout technical credit, beyond the cinematography, is the guitar-driven score, which at times infuses the film with something of a country vibe."

References

External links
 

2016 films
2016 comedy films
Romanian independent films
2010s Romanian-language films
Romanian comedy films
Films about lotteries
2016 independent films